This is a list of mayors of the City of Yarra local government area in  Melbourne, Victoria, Australia, which was formed in 1994 by the amalgamation of the City of Fitzroy, City of Collingwood and the City of Richmond.

Commissioners (1994-1996)

Mayors (1996 to present)

 From 1996 until 2004, the annual election of the mayor for the following 12 months occurred in March. New legislation effective from 2004 onwards changed the date of the election of the mayor to November or December. There was a truncated transitional term of office from March to November 2004.

In the above table, 
"Labor" refers to the Labor Party
"Greens" refers to the Australian Greens Victoria

See also
List of mayors of Fitzroy
List of mayors of Collingwood
List of mayors of Richmond

External links
City of Yarra

References
Yarra Mayors and Councillors: Past and Present

Yarra
Mayors Yarra
City of Yarra